Woo! is the first release by Omaha, Nebraska-based band Tilly and the Wall. It was self-released in 2003 with 6 songs, recorded in Conor Oberst's basement studio.

Track listing
 "I Can't Believe You" – 2:56
 "Shake Shake" – 4:03
 "Do You Dream at All" – 2:29
 "In Bed All Day" – 4:02
 "Pictures of Houses" – 2:41
 "Sad for Days" – 3:30

External links
Official Tilly and the Wall website
Team Love Records

Self-released albums